Kang Jung-hoon (born January 10, 1976) is a Korean footballer. He currently plays for Daejeon Citizen, a South Korean side.

He is one of two players who have played for Daejeon Citizen for over 10 years. He started his football-life at Daejeon in 1998. And over 10 years represented the Daejeon side, in positions ranging from wing-back to defensive midfielder.

His 200th league appearance (league+league cup) was the opening match for the 2006 season. Fans expect and hope that he will be with them until he retires, cementing his status as a legendary player for Daejeon Citizen.

References

1976 births
Living people
South Korean footballers
Daejeon Hana Citizen FC players
K League 1 players
Hanyang University alumni
Sportspeople from South Jeolla Province

Association football midfielders